Siping station (四平站) is a railway station in the town of Siping, Jilin, China. It is one of two railway stations in the city, the other being Siping East railway station.

Stations on the Beijing–Harbin Railway
Railway stations in Jilin